Austin Krajicek and John Peers were the defending champions, but Peers chose not to compete.
Krajicek paired with Mitchell Krueger but lost in the semifinals to eventual finalists Bradley Klahn and Michael Venus.
Frank Dancevic and Peter Polansky won the title 7–5, 6–3.

Seeds

Draw

References 
 Draw

Fifth Third Bank Tennis Championships - Men's Doubles
2013 MD